Thomas Chamberlayne (1805 – 21 October 1876) was an English first-class cricketer and yachtsman.

Early life
He was born 12 April 1805 at Charlton, Kent, the son of the Reverend Thomas Chamberlayne and Maria Francesca Walker. He married in 1830 Amelia Onslow, the daughter of Denzil Onslow (1770–1838), a General in the Grenadier Guards and an amateur cricketer. He served as High Sheriff of Hampshire in 1833.

Cricket career
In 1842 three local gentlemen, Chamberlayne, Sir Frederick Hervey-Bathurst and Sir John Barker-Mill, financed the development of the Antelope Ground in Southampton.

Chamberlayne made his first-class debut for Hampshire against Marylebone Cricket Club in 1842. From 1842 to 1849 Chamberlayne represented Hampshire in fourteen first-class matches, with his final first-class match coming against an All England Eleven in 1849.

Additionally, Chamberlayne played a single first-class match for the Marylebone Cricket Club against Petworth in 1844.

In his first-class career, Chamberlayne scored 53 runs at a very low batting average of 2.65, with a high score of 24.

Yachting & other interests
Chamberlayne's yacht the Arrow, took part in the inaugural America's Cup race in 1851.

Chamberlayne was a hunting and coursing enthusiast, who built both new stables and, as was his love for cricket, he built a cricket field at the family home at Cranbury Park.

Death
Chamberlayne died at his estate, Cranbury Park on 21 October 1876.

Family

His uncle William Chamberlayne (1760–1829) was Member of Parliament for Southampton from 1818 until his death. Whilst serving the town, William Chamberlayne was also chairman of the company supplying gas lighting to the town of Southampton and donated the iron columns for the new gas street-lights. In 1822, the townspeople erected a memorial consisting of an iron Doric column; this now stands in Houndwell Park, near the city centre.

His eldest son, Denzil Chamberlayne, took part in the Charge of the Light Brigade. He died before Thomas in 1873.

His second son Tankerville Chamberlayne later inherited Cranbury Park. He also played first-class cricket for Hampshire as well as holding a keen interest in yachting. Tankerville was also a member of parliament, serving the Southampton constituency three times, as a Conservative. Following the 1895 General Election allegations were made concerning his conduct and this resulted in his being unseated.

References

External links
Thomas Chamberlayne at Cricinfo
Thomas Chamberlayne at CricketArchive
Matches and detailed statistics for Thomas Chamberlayne

1805 births
1876 deaths
People from Charlton, London
English cricketers
Hampshire cricketers
Marylebone Cricket Club cricketers
America's Cup
High Sheriffs of Hampshire
Presidents of the Marylebone Cricket Club
Onslow family